Vivian Nunatak is a nunatak which marks the southwestern extremity of the Mackay Mountains in Marie Byrd Land. Mapped by United States Antarctic Service (USAS) (1939–41) and by United States Geological Survey (USGS) from surveys and U.S. Navy air photos (1959–65). Named by Advisory Committee on Antarctic Names (US-ACAN) for Lieutenant John F. Vivian, U.S. Navy Reserve, co-pilot of LC-130F Hercules aircraft during Operation Deep Freeze 1968.

Nunataks of Marie Byrd Land